West Auckland most commonly refers to:

West Auckland, County Durham, England
West Auckland, New Zealand

West Auckland may also refer to:

Locations
West Auckland Airport, near Parakai in the northwestern Auckland Region of New Zealand
West Auckland (New Zealand electorate), a former parliamentary electorate in New Zealand
West Auckland railway station, in County Durham, England

Sports teams
West Auckland Town F.C., a football club in County Durham, England
West Auckland Admirals, an ice hockey team in Auckland, New Zealand
West Auckland Kiwi True Blues FC, a football club in Auckland, New Zealand

See also

 Auckland West (New Zealand electorate), a former parliamentary electorate in New Zealand
 
 Auckland (disambiguation)
 West (disambiguation)